"Stop! And Think it Over" is a 1967 song written by Sid Tepper and Roy C. Bennett, and performed by Perry Como.  Released as a single, it was the first of three number ones for Como on the Easy Listening chart, spending a single week at the top in June 1967. On the Billboard Hot 100, it reached number ninety-two.

See also
List of number-one adult contemporary singles of 1967 (U.S.)

References

1967 singles
Perry Como songs
Songs written by Sid Tepper
Songs written by Roy C. Bennett
1967 songs